Eupanacra mindanaensis is a moth of the  family Sphingidae. It is known from the Philippines.

The length of the forewings is 24–26 mm for males and 26–29 mm for females. It is similar to Eupanacra malayana. Furthermore, the gold bands on the abdomen are more clearly visible. There is a pale median band on the hindwing upperside.

References

Eupanacra
Moths described in 2000